"Pillaa Raa" is an Indian Telugu language song composed by Chaitan Bharadwaj and sung by Anurag Kulkarni for the soundtrack of the 2018 romantic action-thriller film RX 100.  The lyrics are penned by Chaitanya Prasad. The song's official lyrical version was released on 26 June 2018, while the full video song was released on 06 August 2018 under the music label Mango Music. The video song features Kartikeya and Payal Rajput who play the lead roles in the film.

Music video 
The full video version of the song was officially released on 06 August 2018 on YouTube by Mango Music. The music video features Kartikeya Gummakonda and Payal Rajput acting for the single.

Reception 
The music video was popular because of its new-age music. The singer of the song, Anurag Kulkarni received huge recognition in Telugu music for his work for the song.

The film RX 100, gained popularity and recognition due to this song at the early stage of its release. After the release, the film went on to become superhit due to its versatile story-telling. Pillaa Raa became one of the most-played Telugu songs of the year.

Records 
The full video version of the song has around 250 million views and the lyrical version of the song has around 20 million views on YouTube.

Other versions 
Mango Music also produced other versions of the song, such as the female version, Karaoke version and others.

Awards and nominations

References

External links 

 
 

Telugu film songs
2018 songs
Indian songs
Telugu-language songs
Songs written for films